Model F may refer to:

Model F keyboard, a series of computer keyboards introduced by IBM
Arrow Model F, a 1930s two-seat low-wing sports aircraft
Cadillac Model F, an automobile developed in the 1900s
Curtiss Model F, a family of biplane flying boats developed in the United States in the years leading up to World War I
Toyota LiteAce MasterAce, also known as the Toyota Model F